In sports leagues, promotion and relegation  is a process where teams are transferred between multiple divisions based on their performance for the completed season. Leagues that use promotion and relegation systems are often called open leagues. In a system of promotion and relegation, the best-ranked team(s) in the lower division are promoted to the higher division for the next season, and the worst-ranked team(s) in the higher division are relegated to the lower division for the next season. In some leagues, playoffs or qualifying rounds are also used to determine rankings. This process can continue through several levels of divisions, with teams being exchanged between adjacent divisions. During the season, teams that are high enough in the league table that they would qualify for promotion are sometimes said to be in the promotion zone, and those at the bottom are in the relegation zone or Reg zone (colloquially the drop zone or facing the drop).

An alternate system of league organization, used primarily in Australia, Canada, Singapore and the United States, is a closed model based on licensing or franchises. This maintains the same teams from year to year, with occasional admission of expansion teams and relocation of existing teams, and with no team movement between the major league and minor leagues.

Overview

The number of teams exchanged between the divisions is almost always identical. Exceptions occur when the higher division wishes to change the size of its membership, or has lost one or more of its clubs (to financial insolvency or expulsion, for example) and wishes to restore its previous membership size, in which case fewer teams are relegated from that division, or (less often) more teams are accepted for promotion from the division below. Such variations usually cause a "knock-on" effect through the lower divisions. For example, in 1995 the Premier League voted to reduce its numbers by two and achieved the desired change by relegating four teams instead of the usual three, whilst allowing only two promotions from Football League Division One. Even in the absence of such extraordinary circumstances, the pyramid-like nature of most European sports league systems can still create knock-on effects at the regional level. For example, in a higher league with a large geographical footprint and multiple feeder leagues each representing smaller geographical regions, should most or all of the relegated teams in the higher division come from one particular region then the number of teams to be promoted or relegated from each of the feeder leagues may have to be adjusted, or one or more teams playing near the boundary between the feeder leagues may have to transfer from one feeder league to another to maintain numerical balance.

The system is said to be the defining characteristic of the "European" form of professional sports league organization. Promotion and relegation have the effect of allowing the maintenance of a hierarchy of leagues and divisions, according to the relative strength of their teams. They also maintain the importance of games played by many low-ranked teams near the end of the season, which may be at risk of relegation. In contrast, the final games of a low-ranked US or Canadian team serve little purpose, and in fact losing may be beneficial to such teams because they offer a better position in the next year's draft.

Although not intrinsic to the system, problems can occur due to the differing monetary payouts and revenue-generating potential that different divisions provide to their clubs. For example, financial hardship has sometimes occurred in leagues where clubs do not reduce their wage bill once relegated. This usually occurs for one of two reasons: first, the club can't move underperforming players on, or second, the club is gambling on being promoted back straight away and is prepared to take a financial loss for one or two seasons to do so. Some leagues (most notably English football's Premier League) offer "parachute payments" to its relegated teams for the following year(s). The payouts are higher than the prize money received by some non-relegated teams and are designed to soften the financial hit that clubs take whilst dropping out of the Premier League. However, in many cases, these parachute payments just serve to inflate the costs of competing for promotion among the lower division clubs as newly relegated teams retain a financial advantage.

In some countries and at certain levels, teams in line for promotion may have to satisfy certain non-playing conditions in order to be accepted by the higher league, such as financial solvency, stadium capacity, and facilities. If these are not satisfied, a lower-ranked team may be promoted in their place, or a team in the league above may be saved from relegation.

While the primary purpose of the promotion and relegation system is to maintain competitive balance, it may also be used as a disciplinary tool in special cases. On several occasions, the
Italian Football Federation has relegated clubs found to have been involved in match fixing.  This occurred most recently in 2006, when the season's initial champions Juventus were relegated to Serie B, and two other teams were initially relegated but then restored to Serie A after appeal (see 2006 Serie A scandal).

International sport
Promotion and relegation is used in international sports leagues such as in Europe, and many other parts of the world.  It may be used in international sports tournaments. In tennis, the Davis Cup and Billie Jean King Cup have promotion and relegation, with a 'World Group' (split into two divisions in the Billie Jean King Cup) at the top and series of regional groups at a lower level. The World Groups in both use a knockout tournament format, with the first-round losers entering play-offs with winners from regional groups to avoid relegation. In international tournaments, this format allows teams from countries in which a sport is less well established to have competitive matches, while opening up the possibility of competing against higher ranked nations as a sport grows. Other international tournaments which employ promotion and relegation include the Ice Hockey World Championships, Bandy World Championships, Floorball World Championships, the UEFA Nations League, the CONCACAF Nations League, the World Cricket League and the European Team Championships in athletics.

Historical comparisons

Early baseball leagues in the United States
In baseball, the earliest American sport to develop professional leagues, the National Association of Base Ball Players (NABBP) was established in 1857 as a national governing body for the game. In many respects, it would resemble England's Football Association when founded in 1863. Both espoused strict amateurism in their early years and welcomed hundreds of clubs as members.

Baseball's National Association was not able to survive the onset of professionalism.  It responded to the trend – clubs secretly paying or indirectly compensating players – by establishing a "professional" class for 1869. As quickly as 1871, most of those clubs broke away and formed the National Association of Professional Base Ball Players (NAPBBP). That new, professional Association was open at a modest fee, but it proved to be unstable.  It was replaced by the National League of Professional Base Ball Clubs in 1876, which has endured to the present day.  The founders of the new League judged that in order to prosper, they must make baseball's highest level of competition a franchise based system with exclusive membership, a strict limit on the number of teams, and each member having exclusive rights to their local market.

The modest National League guarantee of a place in the league year after year would permit the owners to monopolize fan bases in their exclusive territories and give them the confidence to invest in infrastructure, such as improved ballparks. In turn, those would guarantee the revenues to support traveling halfway across a continent for games. Indeed, after its first season, the new league banked on its still doubtful stability by expelling its members in New York and Philadelphia (the two largest cities), because they had breached agreements to visit the four western clubs at the end of the season.

The NL's dominance of baseball was challenged several times after its first few years, but only by entire leagues. Eight clubs, the established norm for a national league, was a prohibitively high threshold for a new venture.  Two challengers succeeded beyond the short-term, with the National League fighting off a challenge from the American Association after a decade (concluded 1891).  In 1903 it accepted parity with the American League and the formation of the organization that would become Major League Baseball.  The peace agreement between the NL and the AL did not change the "closed shop" of top-level baseball but entrenched it by including the AL in the shop. This was further confirmed by the Supreme Court's 1922 ruling in Federal Baseball Club v. National League, giving MLB a legal monopoly over professional baseball in the US.

The other major professional sports leagues in the United States and Canada have followed the MLB model of a franchise based system.

Early football leagues in England

In contrast to baseball's NABBP, the first governing body in English football survived the onset of professionalism, which it formally accepted in 1885. Perhaps the great geographical concentration of population and the corresponding short distances between urban centres was crucial. Certainly it provided the opportunity for more clubs' developing large fan bases without incurring great travel costs. Professional football did not gain acceptance until after the turn of the 20th century in most of Southern England. The earliest league members travelled only through the Midlands and North.

When The Football League (now the English Football League) was founded in 1888, it was not intended to be a rival of The Football Association but rather the top competition within it. The new league was not universally accepted as England's top-calibre competition right away. To help win fans of clubs outside The Football League, its circuit was not closed; rather, a system was established in which the worst teams at the end of each season would need to win re-election against any clubs wishing to join.

A rival league, the Football Alliance, was formed in 1889. When the two merged in 1892, it was not on equal terms; rather, most of the Alliance clubs were put in the new Football League Second Division, whose best teams would move up to the First Division in place of its worst teams. Another merger, with the top division of the Southern League in 1920, helped form the Third Division in similar fashion. Since then no new league has been formed of non-league clubs to try to achieve parity with The Football League (only to play at a lower level, like independent professional leagues in American baseball today).

For decades, teams finishing near the bottom of The Football League's lowest division(s) faced re-election rather than automatic relegation. But the principle of promotion and relegation had been firmly established, and it eventually expanded to the football pyramid in place today. Meanwhile, The FA has remained English football's overall governing body, retaining amateur and professional clubs rather than breaking up.

Use in other competitions 
Promotion and relegation has been used in several eSports leagues. Blizzard Entertainment's video game StarCraft II has a "ladder" that uses a promotion and relegation system, where individual players and pre-made teams can be promoted and relegated during the first few weeks of a league season, which generally lasts around 11 weeks, with promotion and relegation taking place based on a skill rating, which is in turn based on wins and losses. However, this form of matchmaking is not typically used for StarCraft II e-sports tournaments, which have various kinds of structures depending on the organizer, the most important being the ESL Pro Tour . The most professional League of Legends leagues like the League of Legends Championship Series and League of Legends Champions Korea use a promotion and relegation system, although the LCS moved away from this in 2018 for North America LCS and 2019 for the European LCS (which was renamed to the League of Legends European Championship). The Counter-Strike: Global Offensive Majors use a similar system where in the top eight finishers of one of the bi-annual Majors are designated with the "Legends" seed and automatically qualified for the next Major tournament. The best six eliminated teams in the second stage (known as New Legends Stage) of the Major must play a "qualifying" stage (known as New Challengers Stage) with another ten teams from the Minors in order to compete at the New Legends Stage.

From 1993 until 2003, the Eurovision Song Contest used various systems of relegation to reconcile the number of countries wishing to participate (approximately 30 at the time) with the number of performances allowed considering time constraints of a live television program. The addition of a semi-final in 2004 allowed for more than 26 songs, but in 2008 automatic qualification of the previous year's top 10 to the final was removed.

In Brazilian carnival's samba school contest, a similar system is adopted, with the schools from lower divisions, or "groups", the highest tier being currently called the "Special Group" (Grupo Especial). Schools parade in order of groups and ranking from last year contest, with the better ranked inside a group and the higher-tier groups having the privilege of going latter (this means the team has the opportunity of fixing issues with costumes and allegorical floats as well as more rehearsal time). The number of promoted and relegated schools, four until 1997, has been diminishing as time passes, becoming two from 1998 to 2007 and being only one nowadays. There has never been an official reason for that, but it is a fact that the relegated schools have more to lose nowadays, such as access to the Cidade do Samba ("Samba City") facilities. There have been reported several interferences on the contest's final result, especially when traditional schools are involved.

Argentinian football and the average performance system 
From 1957 to 1966 and from 1983 to the present, the Argentine First Division has used a system called Promedios based on the average performance over a number of seasons. Originally the previous two seasons, and later three or four seasons, clubs avoid relegation by having a high coefficient, which is obtained by dividing the points achieved in the last three seasons by the number of matches played in the same period. Teams with the lowest points coefficient at the end of the season are relegated to the Primera B Nacional.

This system has both positive and negative aspects, since all of the matches played for the championship in the last seasons are included in the coefficient for the clubs. Teams have an incentive to score points in every match of the season, meaning teams that are not challenging for the title or fighting relegation in the current season want to win even in the final matches to reduce the risk of relegation in the next season; examples are Club Atlético Banfield being champion of the Torneo Apertura in 2009 and last place in the next championship, the Torneo Clausura 2010, without being relegated until the end of the Torneo Apertura 2010 with a second-to-last place finish.

Similarly, River Plate finished last in the Torneo Apertura 2008 and after two bad campaigns and a mediocre one was relegated in the Torneo Clausura 2011 despite being in fifth place and qualifying for the 2011 Copa Sudamericana. This system forces the newly promoted teams to fight relegation from the very beginning of the season. It also allows teams with a low budget with previous good campaigns to compete in international competitions without having to prioritize the championship to avoid relegation; examples of this are Club Atlético Lanús, winner of the 2013 Copa Sudamericana, or Club Atlético Talleres, winner of the 1999 Conmebol Cup. The Uruguayan First Division adopted the same system in 2016.

Also, a similar system was used only in the 1999 edition of Campeonato Brasileiro Série A.

See also
 List of association football leagues without promotion and relegation
 List of unrelegated association football clubs
 List of association football clubs with multiple consecutive promotions or relegations
 Yo-yo club

References
Notes

Bibliography

External links
 Rec.Sport.Soccer Statistics Foundation Source for historical information on promoted and relegated football clubs.

Association football terminology
Sports terminology